Molathegi Podile is a Botswanan former footballer who played as a striker. He played one game for the Botswana national football team in 1999.

External links
 

Living people
Association football forwards
Botswana footballers
Botswana international footballers
Mochudi Centre Chiefs SC players
Year of birth missing (living people)